The Senate Standing Committee on Social Affairs, Science and Technology (SOCI) is a standing committee of the Senate of Canada.

It has a mandate to examine legislation and matters relating to social affairs, science and technology generally, including: (1) veterans affairs; (2) Indian and Inuit affairs; (3) cultural affairs and the arts; (4) social and labour matters; (5) health and welfare; (6) pensions; (7) housing; (8) fitness and amateur sport; (9) employment and immigration; (10) consumer affairs; and (11) youth affairs (Rule 86(1)(m)).

From 1984 to 2000 the committee in each session established a Subcommittee on Veterans Affairs to examine matters pertaining specifically to Canadian veterans.

Members 
As of March 30, 2022, the committee's members are:
 Ratna Omidvar, chair
 Patricia Bovey, deputy chair
 Wanda Thomas Bernard
 Donna Dasko
 Stan Kutcher
 Frances Lankin
 Marilou McPhedran
 Rosemary Moodie
 Dennis Patterson
 Chantal Petitclerc
 Rose-May Poirier
 Josée Verner

The Representative of the Government in the Senate and Leader of the Opposition in the Senate are both ex-officio members of the committee.

References

Committees of the Senate of Canada